Francis Gilfillan DD (February 16, 1872 – January 13, 1933) was an Irish-born prelate of the Roman Catholic Church. He served as bishop of the Diocese of St. Joseph in Missouri from 1923 until his death in 1933.

Biography

Early life 
Francis Gilfillan was born  on February 16, 1872, in Aughavas, County Leitrim in Ireland. He received his classical education at St. Mary's Seminary in Moyne, County Longford, from 1886 to 1889. From 1889 to 1894, he studied philosophy and theology at St. Patrick's College in Carlow, Ireland. Gilfillan immigrated to the United States to enter the Catholic University of America in Washington, D.C., where he received a Doctor of Divinity degree.

Priesthood 
Gilfillan was ordained to the priesthood for the Archdiocese of St. Louis by Archbishop John J. Kain on June 24, 1895. After his ordination, Gilfillan served as a curate at the Cathedral of St. Louis Parish. In 1907, he was appointed pastor of the parish. He also served as a board member of Kenrick Seminary in St. Louis and of the Theological Conferences' Committee of the Board of Synodal Examiners.

Coadjutor Bishop and Bishop of St. Joseph 
On July 8, 1922, Gilfillan was appointed coadjutor bishop of Diocese of St. Joseph and titular bishop of Pegae by Pope Pius XI. He received his episcopal consecration on November 8, 1922, from Archbishop John J. Glennon, with Bishops Christopher E. Byrne and Thomas F. Lillis serving as co-consecrators. Upon the death of Bishop Maurice F. Burke on March 17, 1923, Gilfillan automatically succeeded him as the third bishop of St. Joseph. 

As bishop, Gilfillan chose to live in a residence for priests rather than reside in the episcopal residence.  He opened an orphanage in St. Joseph and built the Christian Brothers High School in that city.

Death and legacy 
Francis Gilfillan died at his residence in St. Joseph, Missouri, on January 13, 1933, at age 60.

See also

References

1872 births
1933 deaths
19th-century Irish people
20th-century Irish people
Irish emigrants to the United States (before 1923)
Catholic University of America alumni
People from County Leitrim
American Roman Catholic clergy of Irish descent
Roman Catholic bishops of Saint Joseph
20th-century Roman Catholic bishops in the United States
Alumni of Carlow College